Wrestling from Marigold is an American sports program broadcast from the Marigold Arena in Chicago which aired on the DuMont Television Network from Saturday, September 17, 1949, until March 1955. The show lasted for either 90 or 120 minutes, usually on Saturdays at 9pm ET, and continued to be broadcast on WGN-TV as a non-network show until 1957.

Overview
The show was broadcast live by WGN from Marigold in Chicago, produced by National Wrestling Alliance promoter Fred Kohler, with play-by-play by Jack Brickhouse. Vince Lloyd served as the announcer. Lloyd also did live commercials for such products as Aero Shave. This was the last network TV broadcast of wrestling in the US until Saturday Night's Main Event on NBC in 1985.

Episode status
About 10 episodes of wrestling on DuMont are in the collection of the UCLA Film and Television Archive. Four are titled Pro Wrestling from Chicago and may be from this series. However, it is unclear if the others are from the Marigold in Chicago, or Wrestling from Columbia Park, or some other DuMont series.

See also
List of programs broadcast by the DuMont Television Network
List of surviving DuMont Television Network broadcasts
1949-50 United States network television schedule
Boxing From Jamaica Arena (September 1948 – 1949)
Amateur Boxing Fight Club (September 1949 – 1950)
Boxing From Eastern Parkway (May 1952-May 1954)
Boxing From St. Nicholas Arena (1954-1956) last series to air on the DuMont network
Saturday Night at the Garden (1950-1951)

References

Bibliography
David Weinstein, The Forgotten Network: DuMont and the Birth of American Television (Philadelphia: Temple University Press, 2004) 
Alex McNeil, Total Television, Fourth edition (New York: Penguin Books, 1980) 
Tim Brooks and Earle Marsh, The Complete Directory to Prime Time Network TV Shows, Third edition (New York: Ballantine Books, 1964)

External links
DuMont historical website
List of DuMont and Paramount Television Network wrestling shows at UCLA Film and Television Archive list at Internet Archive blog

American professional wrestling television series
1949 American television series debuts
1955 American television series endings
Black-and-white American television shows
English-language television shows
Chicago television shows
Fred Kohler Enterprises
DuMont sports programming